The 1992 UCI Track Cycling World Championships were the World Championship for track cycling. They took place in Valencia, Spain.

Medal table

Medal summary

External links
 Track Cycling World Championships 2014 to 1893 bikecult.com

Uci Track Cycling World Championships, 1992
Track cycling
UCI Track Cycling World Championships by year
Sports competitions in Valencia
International cycle races hosted by Spain
20th century in Valencia